Peng'an County is a county in Nanchong, Sichuan, China.

Peng'an has an area of 1,334 square kilometers and a population of 720,000 as of 2012.

Climate

References

External links
Official website of Peng'an County Government

County-level divisions of Sichuan
Nanchong